Çaltıbükü is a village in Anamur district of Mersin Province, Turkey. It is situated in the valley of Dragon creek. The population of Çaltıbükü is 163 as of 2011. It is planned that a part of the village (along with Akine, Sarıağaç and Ormancık) will be submerged in Alaköprü Dam reservoir.

References

Villages in Anamur District